Matthew Shaw (born 5 February 1992) is a former professional Australian rules footballer with the Carlton Football Club and previously the Gold Coast Football Club from 2011 to 2018 in the Australian Football League (AFL). He was recruited as an underage player from the Dandenong Stingrays. He made his debut against Melbourne in round 4 of the 2011 season.

Shaw played his junior football with Chelsea & Carrum Junior Football Clubs. He was also a keen cricketer who played for the Carrum Cricket Club & attended Mordialloc College. He supported St Kilda as a child.

He was delisted by Gold Coast at the conclusion of the 2017 season.

Shaw was rookie listed with pick three by Carlton in the 2018 rookie draft and delisted by Carlton at the conclusion of 2018, having played two games for the club.

Following Shaw's departure from Carlton, he signed with the Southport Sharks in the NEAFL.

References

External links

1992 births
Living people
Gold Coast Football Club players
Carlton Football Club players
Chelsea Football Club (Australia) players
Australian rules footballers from Victoria (Australia)
Dandenong Stingrays players